Adenodolichos kaessneri is a plant in the legume family Fabaceae, native to central Africa.

Description
Inflorescences have flowers featuring white petals with coloured veins.

Distribution and habitat
Adenodolichos kaessneri is native to the Democratic Republic of the Congo and Tanzania. Its habitat is in grassland, savanna and Brachystegia woodland. Some populations of the species are present in protected areas.

References

kaessneri
Flora of the Democratic Republic of the Congo
Flora of Tanzania
Plants described in 1913
Taxa named by Hermann Harms